Stanislavsky Street 7 is a residential building in Leninsky District of Novosibirsk, Russia. It was built in 1940. Architects: V. M. Teitel, A. V. Baransky.

Description
Stanislavsky Street 7 is a neoclassical building on the corner of Stanislavsky and Parkhomenko streets.

Gallery

See also
 100-Flat Building

Bibliography

External links
 Stanislavsky Street 7 Жилой дом по улице Станиславского, 7. Novosibdom.ru.

Leninsky District, Novosibirsk
Buildings and structures in Novosibirsk
Buildings and structures completed in 1940
Cultural heritage monuments of regional significance in Novosibirsk Oblast